Sybille Waury (born 9 May 1970) is a German actress.

Biography 
She is probably best known for her portrayal of Tanja Schildknecht in the German TV-series Lindenstraße (since 1985). She also starred as Dorothée in the Schulz & Schulz-movies next to Götz George and Martina Gedeck. Her stage roles include Abigail Williams in The Crucible; Mowgli in The Jungle Book and others.

Waury is married to German writer Joachim Friedmann.

External links 

German television actresses
1970 births
Living people
German film actresses
20th-century German actresses
21st-century German actresses
German stage actresses